Arthur Daniel Kahler Sr. (December 27, 1897 – April 23, 1982) was an American college football and basketball player and coach.  He was listed in "Ripley's Believe It Or Not" as only person to coach at two different major colleges at the same time—head basketball coach at Brown University and football coach at Dickinson College in Carlisle, Pennsylvania.  He later became a coach and athletic director at Southwestern College in Winfield, Kansas.

Playing career
Kahler played football at Southwestern from 1918 until 1922.  Walter Camp referred him as "a line of power" when he played  Camp wrote high praises for his playing ability based on his senior year of 1922.

Coaching career

Sterling
Kahler was the head football coach at Sterling College in Sterling, Kansas  He held that position for three seasons, from 1928 to 1930, compiling a record of 19–5–2.

Brown and Dickinson
Kahler coached men's basketball at Brown University from 1931 to 1938.  At the same time, he was head football coach at Dickinson College,  even though the schools are over 350 miles apart.  Kahler coached his 100th football victory at Dickinson and also introduced night football to the school.  He coached at Dickinson college from 1935 to 1941 and posted a record of 29–25–5.

Southwestern
Kahler was the 11th head football coachat Southwestern College in Winfield, Kansas, serving for two seasons, from 1946 to 1947, and compiling a record of 14–4–1.

Kahler also served as the men's basketball coach at Southwestern for the 1947–48, tallying a mark of 13–13.  He also served as the athletic director of the school as well as coach of the track and field teams.

Honors
Southwestern honored the memory of Kahler by naming the football field "Art Kahler Field."

In 1974, Kahler was inducted into the Kansas Sports Hall of Fame.

Head coaching record

Football

References

External links
 

1897 births
1982 deaths
American men's basketball coaches
Basketball coaches from Kansas
American football tackles
Brown Bears men's basketball coaches
Dickinson Red Devils athletic directors
Dickinson Red Devils football coaches
Southwestern Moundbuilders athletic directors
Southwestern Moundbuilders football coaches
Southwestern Moundbuilders football players
Southwestern Moundbuilders men's basketball coaches
Sterling Warriors football coaches
Sterling Warriors men's basketball coaches
College track and field coaches in the United States
People from Arkansas City, Kansas
Players of American football from Kansas